Paymaster Rear-Admiral Charles Augustus Royer Flood Dunbar, CBE (30 June 1849 – 7 May 1939) was a Royal Navy officer.

References 

1849 births
1939 deaths
Commanders of the Order of the British Empire
Royal Navy rear admirals
Royal Navy personnel of World War I
Royal Navy logistics officers